Bety is a nickname. Notable people with the name include:

Bety of Betsimisaraka  (1735–1805), queen regnant of the kingdom of Betsimisaraka
Bety Cariño (died 2010), Mexican human rights activist
Bety Reis (born 1983), East Timorese actress, director and film producer